All for Nothing? is a Canadian real estate and design television series that airs on the W Network. The series is produced by Mountain Road Productions and is based in Ottawa and its surrounding areas. The first season premiered on October 7, 2010, comprising 13 one-hour episodes and has since aired on Casa. It can also currently be seen on the Ion Life channel in the United States.

In early 2011 the series was renewed for a second season of 26 episodes and Mark Burnett International (MBI) obtained the worldwide distribution and format rights. The second season premiered on W Network on January 3, 2012.

Synopsis
A real estate and home renovation series, "All for Nothing?" is out to prove that you do not need to spend money to make your home sale ready. Each week, two households compete to improve their design-deficient homes, without budgets. The seller with the highest increase in value at the end of two weeks wins the commission-free listing services of realtor and host, Paul Rushforth. During renovations, homeowners get guidance from Paul and designer, Penny Southam, to help get them through mishaps.

Hosts

Paul Rushforth 
Rushforth is the resident real estate expert and co-host for All for Nothing?. He began his real estate career seven years ago He is the CEO/owner of Paul Rushforth Real Estate. He is also the host of a weekly radio show, "Open House – The Real Estate and Mortgage Show". He lives in Ottawa with his wife and three children.

Penny Southam 
Southam is the resident designer and co-host for All for Nothing?. She is an interior designer, specializing in architecture and custom homes. She is the principal of Southam Design Inc. and has been a contributing writer for Style at Home, Canadian Architecture & Design and the Ottawa Citizen. She lives in Ottawa, Canada with her children.

Episodes

Season 1

Season 2

Awards

On August 4, 2011, All for Nothing? was nominated for a Gemini Award in the Best Reality Program or Series category, alongside Dragons' Den (Canada) (CBC), Conviction Kitchen (CityTV), CheF*OFF (Food Network Canada) and Best. Trip. Ever. (Discovery Channel). The series has also won awards two years running at the New York Festivals, having won a Bronze World Medal in 2012 and a Finalist Certificate in 2011, both in the Real Estate/Home Improvement category.

Most recently, All for Nothing? was nominated for a Golden Sheaf Award at the Yorkton Film Festival in the Lifestyle Programs category for Episode 1011 "Mother & Daughter vs. Husband & Wife".

|-
| 2012
| All for Nothing?
| New York Festivals, Category: Real Estate/Home Improvement - Episode 11 "Mother & Daughter vs. Husband & Wife"
|  Finalist Certificate
|-
| 2012
| All for Nothing?
| Summit Awards (SCA), Category: Editing/Effects - MC Gagnon "Episode 18 "Pat & Sue vs. Tracey & Angie"
|  Silver
|-
| 2012
| All for Nothing?
| Golden Sheaf Awards, Category: Lifestyle Programs - Episode 11 "Mother & Daughter vs. Husband & Wife"
| 
|-
| 2011
| All for Nothing?
| Gemini Award, Category: Best Reality Program or Series
| 
|-
| 2011
| All for Nothing?
| Summit Awards (SCA), Category: Editing/Effects - MC Gagnon "Episode 9 De-Clutter vs. Construction"
|  Bronze
|-
| 2011
| All for Nothing?
| Summit Awards (SCA), Category: Direction - Matt West "Episode 1 Big Family vs. Big Family"
|  Bronze
|-
| 2011
| All for Nothing?
| New York Festivals, Category: Real Estate/Home Improvement - Episode 1 "Big Family vs. Big Family"
|  Bronze World Medal
|}

International syndication

See also
 Broken House Chronicles
 Me, My House & I
 Design U
 Be Real with JR Digs
 The Real Estate Adventures of Sandy & Maryse
 The Restaurant Adventures of Caroline & Dave
 Sheltered
 Totally Random (Website & TV Show)

References

External links 
 All for Nothing? on W Network
 All for Nothing? (Prête à vendre) on CASA
 Official All for Nothing? Casting Information Site
 Official All for Nothing? YouTube Channel
 Official All for Nothing? Twitter
 Official All for Nothing? Facebook
 Production Company Website
 The Paul Rushforth Team
 Southam Design
 Mark Burnett International Picks Up 'All for Nothing?', The Hollywood Reporter
 Paul & Penny on CTV Morning Live (Ottawa), November 17, 2011
 Paul & Penny on Rogers / Your World This Week, February 17, 2012

2010s Canadian reality television series
2010 Canadian television series debuts
W Network original programming